The 2022–23 Midlands Football League is the 2nd season of the Midlands Football League, part of the sixth tier of the Scottish football pyramid system. Carnoustie Panmure are the reigning champions.

Teams

Stadia and locations

League table

Results

Notes
 Club with an SFA licence eligible to participate in the Highland League promotion play-off should they win the league.

References

External links

Midlands Football League seasons
6
SCO
Sco6